Sonaco is a town and sector in the Gabú Region of Guinea-Bissau.

Populated places in Guinea-Bissau
Sectors of Guinea-Bissau